Kaeng Luang railway station is a railway station in Mae Pan Subdistrict, Long District, Phrae Province. It is a class 3 railway station 546.946 km from Bangkok railway station. It is on the Northern Line of the State Railway of Thailand. The railway line between Pak Pan and Kaeng Luang runs adjacent to the Kaeng Luang rapids, of which the station is named after.

Train services 
 Local 407/408 Nakhon Sawan-Chiang Mai-Nakhon Sawan

References 
 Ichirō, Kakizaki (2010). Ōkoku no tetsuro: tai tetsudō no rekishi. Kyōto: Kyōtodaigakugakujutsushuppankai. 
 Otohiro, Watanabe (2013). Tai kokutetsu yonsenkiro no tabi: shasō fūkei kanzen kiroku. Tōkyō: Bungeisha. 

Railway stations in Thailand
Buildings and structures in Phrae province